Israel–Thailand relations refers to diplomatic and cultural ties between the State of Israel and the Kingdom of Thailand. The countries have had official relations since June 1954. The Israeli embassy in Bangkok was established in 1958. Since 1996, Thailand has had an embassy in Tel Aviv. Thailand and Israel share a close and friendly relationship, and cooperate on many fields. People-to-people relations between the two countries are also good, as thousands of Thais are employed in Israel, and millions of Israelis have visited and continue to visit Thailand.

History
On 28 December 1972, a four-member commando of the Palestinian terrorist group Black September invaded the Israeli embassy in Bangkok and held the ambassador and several of his guests as hostages. Two Thai government members, Dawee Chullasapya and Chatichai Choonhavan, who was then deputy foreign minister and became prime minister in 1988, along with the Egyptian ambassador to Thailand, Mustapha el Assawy, negotiated the release of the hostages and instead offered themselves and a number of other Thai officials as surety for the terrorists' safe conduct to Cairo. Then-Israeli prime minister Golda Meir praised the Thai government for their diplomacy which made for a bloodless end of the crisis.

In January 2004, Princess Maha Chakri Sirindhorn inaugurated a joint Israeli-Thai agro-technology experimental farm for irrigation of high value crops at Khon Kaen University. There is a Thai-Israel Chamber of Commerce, Thai-Israel Friendship Foundation, as well as a small community of Israelis living in Thailand.

After the Thai floods of 2011, Israel sent water management experts to Thailand. Princess Chulabhorn Mahidol is involved in advancing scientific cooperation between the two countries.
 
In 2012 the two countries signed a trade agreement.

Thailand recognized Palestine in 2012. During 2014 Israel–Gaza conflict the Thai government  supported a peaceful solution to the conflict and called on both sides to show restraint. It further stated that it will continue to support both Israel and Palestine, but will not condone terrorist activity by either side. 

Thailand is one of the top tourist destinations for Israelis, and Israel became popular for Thai migrant workers. More than 20 thousand Thais are employed in Israel in agriculture and in Asian restaurants as cooks. They work legally under the aegis of the Thai–Israeli bilateral agreement, the Thai-Israel Cooperation on the Placement of Workers (TIC).

In September 2014, the two countries signed a cooperation agreement. 

In July 2015, Israel and Thailand signed a medical cooperation agreement. 

A delegation from the Thailand industrial association visited Israel in 2015. 

The Thai public is generally apathetic to the Israeli-Palestinian conflict, but the Muslim minority in the country, nearly four million, is generally sympathetic to Palestine.

In June and July 2018, Israeli commandos and technology supported Thai Navy SEALs during the highly publicisized Tham Luang cave rescue mission. The operation was a complete success, rescuing the entire soccer team.

See also

Foreign relations of Israel
Foreign relations of Thailand

References

 
Thailand
Bilateral relations of Thailand